The 1922–23 season was Stoke's 23rd season in the Football League and the 19th in the First Division.

With Stoke's achievements last season they found themselves back in the First Division for the first time since 1907; however it would prove to be a short stay. In their opening eight matches, Stoke collected just two points and found themselves bottom of the table. Despite spending money on improving the squad, results were still poor and manager Arthur Shallcross was sacked in April 1923. He was replaced with former England international Jock Rutherford, but he was unable to avoid relegation. Rutherford then completed the shortest managerial spell in the club's history as a heated argument with the directors led him to resign just four weeks into his tenure.

Season review

League
With the club's First Division ambitions achieved, there was more than the usual air of optimism for the 1922–23 season, but things did not go according to plan and from their opening eight matches, Stoke claimed just two points (both draws) and found themselves anchored to the bottom of the table. Stoke's first win of the season came away at West Bromwich Albion when Harry Davies scored the only goal in his second appearance. Again the director's ambition and determination to maintain First Division status showed through with the arrivals of Joe Kasher and Bert Ralphs to name a few.  This belated heavy expenditure on players cost the finance's dearly, but good crowds were able to cover the cost. Unfortunately relegation was not avoided and Stoke made an instant return to the Second Division.

Former England international Jock Rutherford was appointed manager of Stoke in April 1923, taking over from Arthur Shallcross who had served the club for the previous four years. However his stay was brief and after a heated row with directors the quickly left leaving Stoke without a manager going into the 1923–24 season.

FA Cup
In the Cup Stoke beat Blyth Spartans 3–0 in the first round before being knocked out 3–1 to Bury.

Final league table

Results
Stoke's score comes first

Legend

Football League First Division

FA Cup

Squad statistics

References

Stoke City F.C. seasons
Stoke